The Office of the Secretary of Defense Medal for Exceptional Civilian Service is the Office of the Secretary of Defense’s (OSD) highest level career medaled award.  

Career civilian employees of the OSD, the Department of Defense, and the Federal government are eligible.

Approval
Approval must be granted from the Head of an OSD Component (e.g., the Secretary of Defense and the Deputy Secretary of Defense; the Under Secretaries of Defense; or one of the Assistant Secretaries of Defense who report directly to the Secretary of Defense, etc.)

This award was established to recognize civilian employees who have distinguished themselves by exceptional service to the Secretary of Defense or a Component within the Office of the Secretary of Defense.  This award consists of a medal, lapel pin, and citation signed by the Secretary or Head of an OSD Component. Subsequent awards consist of the foregoing recognition devices and a bronze, silver, or gold palm, as appropriate.

Nominees shall have served a minimum of three (3) years in an organization receiving operational support from the Washington Headquarters Services' Directorate for Personnel and Security Customer Support Operating Office or in the Joint Staff, or a combination of the two.

For non DOD employees
In lieu of this award, the Office of the Secretary of Defense Exceptional Public Service Award is presented to those 'non-career civilian employees, private citizens, and foreign nationals', for their contributions, assistance, or support who do not derive his or her principal livelihood from U.S. Government employment.  It is OSD's highest level non-career medaled award.

Award Criteria
Performance is characterized by exceptional civilian service to OSD as a whole or the specific OSD Component.

References
ADMINISTRATIVE INSTRUCTION NO. 29. DODI, 1999
SUBJECT: Incentive and Honorary Awards Programs
References: (a) Administrative Instruction No. 29, "Incentive Awards," January 8, 1990
(hereby canceled)
(b) Title 5, United States Code, "Government Organization and Employees"
(c) Title 5, Code of Federal Regulations, "Administrative Personnel"
(d) DoD 1400.25-M, "Department of Defense Civilian Personnel Manual,"
December 1996, authorized by DoD Directive 1400.25, November 25,
1996

Awards and decorations of the United States Department of Defense